Zaida, the Tragedy of a Model is a 1923 German silent film directed by Holger-Madsen and starring Gertrude Welcker, Alf Blütecher and Alexander Murski.

The film's sets were designed by the art director Jack Winter.

Cast
 Gertrude Welcker as Mrs. Sonja Crosshaven
 Olga Belajeff as Violet Lovelace
 Alf Blütecher as Wilfred Bruce - artist
 Alexander Murski as John Crosshaven - solicitor
 Heinrich Peer

References

External links

1923 films
Films of the Weimar Republic
German silent feature films
Films directed by Holger-Madsen
German black-and-white films
1923 drama films
German drama films
Silent drama films
1920s German films